Acratus is a classical name attributed to the following individuals:

Acratus is also the name by which Pausanias called the hero Acratopotes.
Acratus was a freedman of Nero.  He was sent by Nero in 64 AD to Asia and Achaea to plunder the temples and take away the statues of the gods.

References

Sources